Ipoh–Lumut Highway, Federal Route 5, is a 70.7-km federal highway in Perak, Malaysia, connecting the Perakian capital city of Ipoh in the east to Lumut near Sitiawan in the west. The Ipoh–Lumut Highway consists of a 22.7-km super two highway from Jelapang to Seputeh and a 48-km divided highway from Seputeh to Lumut. This highway is a part of the Federal Route 5 and serves as the final section of the FT5 route.

Many maps including Google Maps label this highway as the Ipoh–Lumut Expressway ; however, this is incorrect due to the fact that the Ipoh–Lumut Highway was built as an upgrade of the existing Ipoh–Lumut Road FT5 instead of being a completely new controlled-access expressway route, evidenced by only one grade-separated interchange at Seputeh compared with 34 signalised at-grade intersections along its entire route. As a result, the Ipoh–Lumut Highway is signposted as FT5 and not E19 along its entire route. In addition, the Ipoh–Lumut Expressway E19 has never been included in the list of expressways being monitored by the Malaysian Highway Authority. The E19 route number is currently reassigned to the Sungai Besi-Ulu Klang Elevated Expressway (SUKE) in Selangor and Kuala Lumpur.

History
The Ipoh–Lumut Highway project is a revival of the Ipoh–Lumut Expressway project which was scrapped due to the effects of the 1997 Asian financial crisis. Initially, the Ipoh–Lumut Expressway was supposed to be built as completely new controlled-access expressway route with the tentative route number of E19, with its construction job being privatised and awarded to SILEX Sdn. Bhd. (consisting Teras Cemara Sdn. Bhd. (subsidiary of MRCB) and Perak Corporation Berhad as its main shareholders) as its concessionaire. The concession contract was announced on 20 June 1998; however, the project was later scrapped.

The Ipoh–Lumut Expressway project was later revived as an upgrade of the existing Ipoh–Lumut Road FT5, consisting a new 22.7-km super two highway route from Seputeh to Jelapang that bypasses the old Jalan Lahat FT5, and an upgrade of the 48-km section from Siputeh to Sitiawan to a 4-lane divided highway with partial access control. Construction began on 1 June 2004 and was completed on 28 February 2008. Once completed, the old Jalan Lahat FT5 was degazetted as a Federal Road and was downgraded to a municipal road without any route number.

There is only one grade-separated interchange at Seputeh and 34 signalised intersections along the entire highway, making the entire end-to-end trip to take about 90 minutes. In 2012, the state government of Perak had urged the federal government to upgrade the super two section to a full divided highway to improve traffic flow and travelling time.

List of interchange and intersections

See also
 Malaysia Federal Route 5
  - current highway assigned to E19 route number

References

Highways in Malaysia
Cancelled expressway projects in Malaysia